Vinto is a town in the Cochabamba Department in central Bolivia. It is the seat of the Vinto Municipality, the fourth municipal section of the Quillacollo Province.

Population 
From 1976, the population of Vinto increased as follows:

Medical Care 
Hospitals of Hope is located in Vinto and provides low-cost, quality health care to the surrounding area.

References 

Populated places in Cochabamba Department